Plastic Letters is the second studio album by American rock band Blondie, released in February 1978 by Chrysalis Records. An earlier version with a rearranged track listing was released in Japan in late December 1977.

Overview 
This is the second and final Blondie album to be produced by Richard Gottehrer. "Denis", a cover of Randy & the Rainbows' 1963 song "Denise", was successful across Europe, reaching No. 2 in March 1978 in the United Kingdom, and also reached No. 19 in Australia. "(I'm Always Touched by Your) Presence, Dear" was the second single from the album, reaching No. 10 in the UK in May 1978. The song was written by the band's second bassist, Gary Valentine, shortly before he left for a solo career prior to the recording of Plastic Letters; his departure necessitated Chris Stein playing bass on the album, as well as guitar. During recording Blondie was still signed to their old label, Private Stock Records. The album peaked at No. 10 in the UK and has been certified Platinum by the British Phonographic Industry (BPI). The pink dress Debbie Harry wears in the cover art was designed by Anya Phillips.

Plastic Letters has been remastered digitally and reissued twice: the first time by Chrysalis Records in 1994 with two bonus tracks, and the second in 2001 by EMI-Capitol with four bonus tracks. The latter issue features the earliest demo of the band's future hit "Heart of Glass", then known as "The Disco Song".

Track listing

Personnel
Credits adapted from the liner notes of Plastic Letters.

Blondie
 Chris Stein – lead guitar, guitar, bass, E-bow on "Youth Nabbed as Sniper", vibes
 Deborah Harry – vocals
 Clement Burke – premier drums, backing vocals
 James Destri – grand piano, Farfisa organ, Polymoog synthesizer and strings, Roland synthesizer, backing vocals

Additional personnel
 Richard Gottehrer – production
 Frank "The Freak" Infante – bass, rhythm guitar
 Dale Powers – background vocals on "Kidnapper"
 Rob Freeman – engineering
 Greg Calbi – mastering at Sterling Sound (New York City)
 Phillip Dixon – photographs
 Ramey Communications – art direction, design

Charts

Weekly charts

Year-end charts

Certifications

References

1977 albums
Albums produced by Richard Gottehrer
Blondie (band) albums
Chrysalis Records albums